is a TV station affiliated with Nippon News Network (NNN) and Nippon Television Network System (NNS) in Kagoshima, Kagoshima.  It is broadcast in Kagoshima Prefecture. It was established on April 1, 1994.

TV channel

Digital Television 
  Kagoshima 29ch JOUI-DTV

Tandem office 
 Akune 14ch
Kanoya 49ch 
Makurazaki 39ch 
Kamō 20ch 
Ōkuchi 19ch 
Kushikino 14ch 
Minamitane 17ch 
Nakanoshima 30ch 
Naze 17ch 
Other

Program

External links
 The official website of Kagoshima Yomiuri Television 

Nippon News Network
Television stations in Japan
Television channels and stations established in 1994
Mass media in Kagoshima
1994 establishments in Japan